Eskandar Kola (also Romanized as Eskandar Kolā) is a village in Aliabad Rural District, in the Central District of Qaem Shahr County, Mazandaran Province, Iran. At the 2006 census, its population was 1,882, in 493 families.

References 

Populated places in Qaem Shahr County